Expressway S2 is a short highway in Poland, serving as the southern section of the (partially completed) Warsaw Express Ring Road. Conceptually forming one continuous route with motorway A2, it was initially planned (since 1970s) as a part of it, however after local Warsaw residents objected to the plans of an inner-city motorway, the proposed road was downgraded to an expressway (though the actual route was not changed). The western half of the road was opened to traffic in 2013, while the eastern half was opened in 2020 and 2021.

History of construction
Construction of the first phase of the project was divided into two sections. Work on a 3.9 km stretch between Warszawa Lotnisko junction (linking to expressway S79) and Puławska junction at the eastern end of this phase of the project began in September 2009, while construction of the other, 11.1 km long section between the western Konotopa junction (linking the motorway A2 and the western portion of the ring road, expressway S8) and Warszawa Lotnisko junction, began in the Summer of 2010.

Both sections were scheduled to be completed in mid 2012 in time for the Euro 2012 football championships, however this deadline was not met. The S2 Expressway was eventually opened in a number of stages, beginning in the west at Konotopa junction in August 2013, with further sections opening in September 2013, linking the road with expressway S79 leading to Warsaw Chopin Airport. The final part of this phase of the project up to Puławska junction was opened in late September 2013.

The second phase of the project took the expressway S2 east of Puławska across the Vistula river, through the Anna Jagiellon Bridge, connecting the route with the eastern part of the Warsaw Express Ring Road and the continuation of the motorway A2 eastwards. The design-and-build tender for this section (divided into 3 separate contracts) was announced on December 18, 2013, with completion date specified as 41 months from the date contract is signed (not counting 3 winter months). The contract was signed in December, 2015, with completion planned for December, 2020.  The final section including the Ursynów Tunnel  opened on December 20, 2021.

The contracts were:

 Contract A (4.6 km) including tunnel under Ursynów : Astaldi S.p.A., price about 1 222 mln zł.
 Contract B (6.45 km) including a bridge over the Vistula river: Gülermak Ağır Sanayi İnşaat ve Taahhüt A.S. and PBDiM Mińsk Maz. , price about 757.6 mln zł.
 Contract C (7.45 km) including overpasses in Masovian Landscape Park: Warbud S.A. price about 561.7 mln zł.
 Oversight: Egis Polska Inżynieria Sp. z o.o., price about 53.4 mln zł.

Route description

References

See also
European route E30

Expressways in Poland
Constituent roads of European route E30